The 2019 VFL Women's season was the fourth season of the VFL Women's (VFLW). The season commenced on 5 May and concluded with the Grand Final on 22 September 2019. The competition was contested by thirteen clubs. This was to be the last VFLW season until 2021, with no competition held in 2020 due to the impact of the COVID-19 pandemic.

Clubs

Ladder

Finals series

Qualifying and Elimination finals

Semi-finals

Preliminary final

Grand Final

Awards
 Lambert-Pearce Medal (Best and Fairest): Lauren Pearce (Darebin)
 Rohenna Young Medal (Leading Goal kicker): Jaimee Lambert (Collingwood) – 21 goals
 Debbie Lee Medal (Rising Star): Olivia Vesely (Southern Saints)
 Coach of the Year: Tom Hunter (Richmond)
 Lisa Hardeman Medal (Best on ground VFL Women's Grand Final): Stacey Livingstone (Collingwood)

References